Only the Brave is a 1994 Australian film directed by Ana Kokkinos.

See also

 Only the Brave (disambiguation)

References

External links

Only the Brave at Australian Screen Online

Australian romantic drama films
1994 films
1990s English-language films
1990s Australian films